Air Algérie Flight 6289 (AH6289) was an Algerian domestic passenger flight from Tamanrasset to the nation's capital of Algiers with a stopover in Ghardaïa, operated by Algerian national airliner Air Algérie. On 6 March 2003, the aircraft operating the flight, a Boeing 737-2T4, crashed near the Trans-Sahara Highway shortly after taking off from Tamanrasset's Aguenar – Hadj Bey Akhamok Airport, killing all but one of the 103 people on board. At the time of the accident, it was the deadliest aviation disaster in Algerian soil.

The investigation concluded that a flight crew error caused the crash following an engine failure shortly after take-off. The captain of Flight 6289 had taken over the control from the First Officer without adequate identification of the actual emergency. As the flight crew could not comprehend the exact cause of the emergency, appropriate corrective actions were not taken. The speed drastically dropped and the aircraft crashed into the terrain.

Background

Aircraft
The aircraft was a  19-year old Boeing 737-2T4 with a manufacturer serial number of 22700. Named as Monts de Daïa (Mountains of Daïa) with an Algerian registration of 7T-VEZ, the aircraft was equipped with two Pratt & Whitney JT8D-17A engines. The aircraft entered service on 9 December 1983 and had flown for more than 40,000 hours.

According to the maintenance logs, the aircraft was maintained in accordance with the written maintenance manual. The last major overhaul had been conducted from October to November 2002. The left engine was installed in 2002 and the right engine was installed in 2001. The left engine and the right engine had accrued a total of 30,586 flight hours and 22,884 flight hours, respectively.

Passengers and crews
The aircraft was carrying 97 passengers. Most of those on board were Algerians. Authorities stated that among the 97 passengers, a total of 39 passengers would have disembarked in Algiers and another 58 were heading to Ghardaia. At least 7 French nationals were initially thought to be on board the flight. The number was later revised down to 6. Among the passengers were 14 members of the Mouloudia d'Adriane football team, who were heading to Ghardaia for the regional qualification of the Algerian League One.

There were 6 crew members on board, consisted of 2 flight crew and 4 cabin crew. The captain, 48-year-old Boualem Benaouicha, had accumulated a total of 10,760 hours of flight experience, including 1,087 hours on the Boeing 737-200 as captain. He had obtained his license to fly a Boeing 737 in 2001. The first officer, identified as 44-year old Yousfi Fatima, had accumulated a total of 5,219 flight hours, including 1,292 hours on the Boeing 737-200. According to Algerian French-newspaper Liberté, she was the daughter of a former Algerian energy and foreign affairs minister.

Accident 

Flight 6289 was a flight from Tamanrasset, the capital of Tamanrasset Province, to the Algerian capital of Algiers with a stopover in Ghardaia. The flight was popular for Algerians and tourists as Tamanrasset was known for its archaeological sites and was the capital of the Tuareg people. The fare was also described as fairly cheap. On 6 March 2003, the flight was carrying 97 passengers and 6 crew members, with First Officer Yousfi Fatima as the pilot flying. The temperature was high and the visibility was good.

At about 15:01 CET, pushback clearance was requested by the crew and the ATC cleared the crew to taxi to Runway 02. As the flight crew reported that they were ready for take-off, the ATC later asked the crew to line up and later cleared the crew for take-off to Ghardaia.

Flight 6289 took off from Tamanrasset at 15:13 CET. Shortly after, an explosion occurred on one of the engines. The explosion was loud enough to be heard by workers in Tamanrasset's air traffic control tower and other witnesses in the area. Debris was seen dropping onto the runway. Due to the explosion, the aircraft swayed to the left; later it veered to the right as the crew tried to correct its heading. Seconds later, First Officer Fatima reported: "We have a small problem!".

It descended with its nose in up position and eventually crashed onto a field at 15:15 CET, striking the ground with its right side and bursting into flames. The wreckage slid across the ground and struck the airport's perimeter fence, crossed a road and finally came to rest.

The impact and the fire that had erupted due to the crash immediately killed 102 people on board. The cockpit occupants, including the captain, first officer, and the chief attendant, were killed due to the impact. The rest of the occupants were killed due to the massive explosion that had been caused by the crash. The sole survivor of the accident was a 28-year-old male Algerian soldier. He was seated in the last row with his seat belt unfastened (as indicated in his statement) and was ejected from the plane upon impact, escaping from the accident. The man was found in a coma with multiple injuries. However, he regained consciousness the next day. Doctors said that his injuries were not life-threatening.

Investigation 
Prime Minister of Algeria Ali Benflis immediately set up an investigative committee in regards to the accident. Under the Algerian Ministry of Transport, the commission was led by M. Affane, then Director General of the Algerian Ministry of Transport. Technical support from the French BEA was requested. Additionally, the investigation was assisted by representatives from the NTSB, FAA and Pratt & Whitney Canada. A total of 7 meetings were held to analyze the result and the progress of the investigation.

Engine failure on take-off 
There were widespread reports that one of the engines had caught fire shortly after take-off from Tamanrasset. Officials also reported that "technical problems" might have been the cause of the crash as there had been reports of an explosion on one of the engines. Testimonies from multiple witnesses were consistent with an explosion as they claimed that a large thumping noise was heard immediately after take-off from Tamanrasset. Initial examination on the runway later revealed the presence of debris from one of the aircraft's engines. During the wreckage examination, investigators discovered that during the flight the left engine was rotating at low speed with no thrust.

A more thorough examination was then carried out. Analysis on the left engine revealed that the nozzle guide vanes (stator blades) had been severely damaged, particularly on the lower part of the engine.  As some parts of the guide vanes were destroyed, the gas inside the engine could not normally expand and eventually prevented the cooling stage, which was triggered by gas leaving the gas chamber. The absence of cooling then caused the high temperature to melt the guide vanes of the low pressure part of the engine, destroying the lower pressure part. This in turn caused a massive drop in engine rotation speed. Metallurgical analysis on the nozzle guide vanes of the high pressure part revealed that there were fatigue cracks on one of the blades, indicating that a blade had broken off during the take-off. This was concluded as the source of the engine failure aboard Flight 6289.

The findings led to the conclusion that an engine failure indeed had occurred aboard the flight. However, the engine failure was actually contained inside the engine itself. The engine cowling did not blow in outward direction, which would have indicated an uncontained engine failure. In the case of uncontained engine failure, the resulting damage would have caused a significant amount of drag, complicating the aircraft's control and ultimately caused the decay of the aircraft's speed. As the engine failure in Flight 6289 was actually contained, then the flight control would not have been much compromised. The crew should have also been able to conduct an emergency landing with only one operating engine.

Flight recorders analysis 
The contained engine failure should not have caused the aircraft to crash as it would not have resulted in control difficulty. With a contained engine failure on only one engine, the crew should have been able to return to the airport safely. A further confirmation was needed from the flight recorders to understand the situation on board that might have explained the exact cause of the crash.

The flight recorders were retrieved from the wreckage on the same day of the accident. The CVR showed few signs of damage, while the FDR was exposed to fire. Both recorders' memory cards were in good condition, allowing a direct readout. On 13 March, the readout was performed by BEA. Due to the old age of the FDR, there were only six recorded parameters; time, pressure altitude, speed, magnetic heading, vertical acceleration, and send/receive VHF communication.

According to the recorders, during the preparation for the flight, First Officer Fatima had conducted the pre-departure checklist by herself as captain Benaouicha was running late. He eventually arrived when Fatima was about to give the pre-flight briefing to the crew members. During the taxiing, the captain could be heard conversing with the chief attendant, who was also in the cockpit, rather than paying attention to the flight operation. There was no discussion on the possible anomaly that might have occurred in-flight, as per the approved Air Algerie procedure.

As the aircraft reached its rotation speed, Captain Benaouicha called for rotation. First Officer Fatima then asked for gear retraction. A second later, a loud thump was heard, indicating the start of the left engine failure. Startled, First Officer Fatima immediately exclaimed the basmala several times, later asking "What's going on?". The Captain immediately took over the control and asked First Officer Fatima to let go of the controls. She stated that she had let go and later offered to retract the gear to the Captain, which was met with no response.

First Officer Fatima immediately reported that Flight 6289 was experiencing a small problem. The aircraft then climbed to a maximum altitude of 398 ft with a speed of 134 knots. The altitude and the speed then dropped and the stick shaker was activated for one second, warning the crew of an impeding stall. The speed continued to drop and the aircraft finally entered a full stall condition. Captain Benaouicha, somehow still unconvinced by his co-pilot, continuously asked First Officer Fatima to let go of the yoke. She continuously insisted that she had let go. This conflict continued until the end of the recording. At 335 ft, both recordings abruptly stopped. The last recorded voice was the "Don't sink" alarm from the aircraft's GPWS. The speed was at 126 knots and the landing gear was still in extended position.

Failure to fly 
There were multiple factors that ultimately caused the aircraft's inability to fly safely. Investigators stated that the occurrence of an engine failure during a critical phase of the flight (e.g. during the aircraft's rotation) would have provided the crew with a very limited amount of time to assess the situation. The take-off weight of Flight 6289 at the time was near its maximum allowable take-off weight, causing a reduction in the aircraft's ability to take-off. The location of the airport and the weather condition, which was located at an elevation of 1,300 ft with a typical hot desert temperature at noon, caused the air density to decrease. The reduction in air density resulted in the reduction of the engine output as well. Thus, the aircraft would have needed a higher airspeed to take-off from the runway.

However, management of the emergency by the flight crew was the most crucial part for the aircraft to be able to return in a safe manner. If the flight crew had taken the correct actions for the emergency immediately, then the aircraft would not have crashed onto the field.

The first sign of crew error was apparent from the initial stage of the flight. Prior to take-off, First Officer Fatima was about to give the crew members a pre-flight briefing when she was suddenly interrupted by Captain Benaouicha. The captain immediately chatted with the chief flight attendant and thus the briefing was discontinued. The pre-flight briefing was crucial as this was the exact moment when flight crew were informed on the roles of each crew members and the appropriate procedures that the crew should have taken in case the crew faced an anomaly during the take-off. The interrupted briefing indicated the crew's failure to emphasize the importance of flight safety in regards to the possible anomalies that might be encountered during a critical phase of the flight.

Captain Benaouicha kept talking to the chief flight attendant even during the aircraft's taxi. This was a breach of the sterile cockpit rule, which prohibited flight crew from engaging in conversations unrelated to the flight during critical phases. During the entire conversation, not a single dialogue was related to a possible anomaly on take-off.

During the aircraft's rotation, the engine suddenly malfunctioned. Captain Benaouicha, without hesitation, immediately initiated role switching from pilot not flying (PNF) to pilot flying (PF). His previous role, PNF, required him to scan the instruments so that the flight crew could understand on the exact cause of the emergency. As he was not PNF anymore, his duty to monitor the aircraft's instruments was immediately handed over to the first officer, who had been at the controls for the entire time prior to the role switch. His decision to switch his role as a PF was unclear. Both flight crew had not agreed to switch roles in case of a flight emergency, leading the first officer to be confused by the captain's decision.

As his tasks were immediately transferred to the first officer, the captain could not fully understand the situation at the time. While he was taking over the control, he repeatedly asked the first officer to let go of her hands from the yoke. The first officer was unsure of her flight role due to the sudden role switch that had been made by the captain. This was indicated by the recording. During the stall warning activation, the first officer's hands were still at the control column.

The sudden switch also created a sudden increase of stress for the captain. Overwhelmed by the sudden task switch, the captain was only focusing on the pitch attitude of the aircraft. He maintained an excessive angle of climb during the entire emergency. His decision was probably influenced by the rocky environment of the airport, which would have made it impossible for the crew to conduct an emergency landing.

At the time of the emergency, the landing gear was still in the extended position. During an engine failure on take-off, the crew should have immediately retracted the landing gear as the extension of landing gear would have resulted in difficult aerodynamics of the aircraft, thus causing a progressive decline of the airspeed. It was the PF's duty to retract the landing gear. Just one second prior to the engine failure, First Officer Fatima was the PF and she had actually requested the captain to retract the landing gear. However, as the role was immediately switched by the captain, then it was up to the captain to request a gear up to the other flight crew. During the emergency, First Officer Fatima had offered to retract the landing gear. As captain Benaouicha was pre-occupied with the emergency, he was not able to hear the first officer's offer. The gear then remained in extended position and the aircraft stayed in its high pitch attitude, diminishing the aircraft's ability to fly and ultimately caused the aircraft to crash.

Conclusion
The final report was published with the following: 

Following the crash, investigators asked Air Algérie to ensure that their cockpit resource management (CRM) training effectively heighten flight crew awareness on the strict respect of following the procedures of the appropriate hand-over and task-sharing. Other recommendations were also issued to the Algerian government.

Aftermath
Crisis centres were immediately set up in Paris and Algiers. Government officials, including Interior Minister Moureddine Yazid Zerhouni and Transport Minister Abdelmalek Sellal, visited Tamanrasset to observe the crash site. A repatriation ceremony for the six French victims was held in Algiers. At least two of the victims were sent to Marseilles while the other four were flown to Paris.

Officials agreed to build a monument for the victims of the crash. A monument was later erected near the crash site of Flight 6289. Multiple events were also held to commemorate the victims of the crash. In the nearby Benmessaoud sports complex in Iméchouène, multiple mini-tournaments were held for the residents in the area. Special sponsorship would also be given to Mouloudia d'Adriane football club, which lost 14 members of the team in the crash. The Algerian Minister of Youth and Sports El-Hadi Ould Ali stated that "The state does not forget its children and full support will be given to this club so that it can return to the sports scene". After the crash, the football club worked hard to promote multiple sport activities in Tamanrasset.

In response to the crash, investigators issued a recommendation for the Algerian government to create an independent investigative body for aircraft accidents in the country. However, this recommendation was not enacted and as of 2022 there is still no independent aircraft accident investigation commission in Algeria.

See also

 Centurion Air Cargo Flight 164
 List of accidents and incidents involving commercial aircraft
 LOT Polish Airlines Flight 7
 LOT Polish Airlines Flight 5055
 United Airlines Flight 232

References

External links
 
Ministry of Public Works and Transport
Official Accident Report info page (Archive)
Full official report – PDF version (Archive)
Official Accident Report info page  (Archive) – The French version is the original version
Full official report  (Archive)

2003 disasters in Africa
Airliner accidents and incidents caused by mechanical failure
Airliner accidents and incidents caused by engine failure
Airliner accidents and incidents involving uncontained engine failure
Aviation accidents and incidents in 2003
Aviation accidents and incidents in Algeria
2003 in Algeria
Accidents and incidents involving the Boeing 737 Original
Air Algérie accidents and incidents
March 2003 events in Africa
Airliner accidents and incidents caused by pilot error
2003 disasters in Algeria